The Ritz-Carlton Philadelphia is a luxury hotel and residential complex in Center City, Philadelphia, Pennsylvania, United States. It comprises three adjoining buildings: the Girard Trust Bank, at the northwest corner of South Broad & Chestnut Streets; the Girard Trust Building, at the southwest corner of South Broad Street & South Penn Square; and The Residences at the Ritz Carlton, at 1414 South Penn Square.

Girard Trust Company

Girard Trust Company – also known as Girard Trust Corn Exchange Bank Building – was built as the headquarters and main branch of the Girard Trust Company, a company founded in 1811. The Beaux Arts building was inspired by the Pantheon in Rome, and was conceived by architect Frank Furness. The commission was shared between the Philadelphia firm of Furness, Evans & Company and the New York firm of McKim, Mead & White. The building was begun in 1905 and completed in 1907.

While its masonry dome is hemispherical on the exterior, the interior is octagonal. The soaring, 4-story Main Banking Room is used as the hotel's restaurant and ballroom.

Girard Trust Building
Girard Trust Building – also known as Girard Trust Company Office Building – is a 394 feet (120-meter) 30-story skyscraper facing City Hall. It was designed by  McKim, Mead & White, and built as an office building in 1930-31. It was later renamed Two Mellon Plaza. The adjacent One Meridian Plaza (built 1972, damaged by a major fire 1991, demolished 1999) was connected to this building. Shortly after One Meridian Plaza's demolition, the building was converted in 2000 into a 330-room Ritz-Carlton hotel. Responsible for the building's conversion are James Garrison and Dr. George C. Skarmeas.

The building is located on the site formerly occupied by the West End Trust Building (1898-1928) by Furness, Evans & Company.

The Residences at the Ritz Carlton
On the former site of One Meridian Plaza stands The Residences at the Ritz Carlton, constructed in 2009.

References

External links
The Ritz-Carlton at emporis.com
Girard Trust Corn Exchange Bank at Philadelphia Architects and Buildings
The Girard Trust Company Building at Philadelphia Architects and Buildings

Commercial buildings completed in 1908
Office buildings completed in 1931
Skyscraper hotels in Philadelphia
1940s architecture in the United States
McKim, Mead & White buildings
1908 establishments in Pennsylvania
Residential skyscrapers in Philadelphia